Stadio Tullio Saleri (formerly Nuovo Stadio Comunale) is a multi-use stadium in Lumezzane, Italy.  It is currently used mostly for football matches and is the home ground of A.C. Lumezzane.  The stadium holds 4,150.

References

Football venues in Italy